Michael Green (born 15 November 1963) is a British swimmer. He competed in the men's 200 metre freestyle at the 1988 Summer Olympics.

References

External links
 

1963 births
Living people
British male swimmers
Olympic swimmers of Great Britain
Swimmers at the 1988 Summer Olympics
People from Barking, London
Sportspeople from London
British male freestyle swimmers
20th-century British people